In Pieces is the fifth studio album by American country music artist Garth Brooks. It was released on August 31, 1993, by Liberty Records. It debuted at #1 on the Billboard 200 and the Top Country Albums chart.

The album was likewise a hit outside the United States. In the United Kingdom, it was Brooks' highest-placed album on the charts. It reached the top ten of the UK country album charts before it was issued officially (due to imports from both the United States and Ireland). Critics felt that this would ruin the album's sales once it was issued. However, when it was eventually issued in Britain in early 1994 it went to #1 on the country charts and reached #2 in the pop charts, and also produced two top-forty hit singles on the British pop charts.

The track "Callin' Baton Rouge" was previously a #37 peaking single in 1987 for the New Grass Revival, whose members back Brooks on his rendition. It was the first time the group had recorded together since they disbanded in 1989.

In an interview with BBC Radio DJ Richard Wooton, Brooks stated that the track "The Cowboy Song" (which was written in 1987 by Roy Robinson) was found in a trash can by someone on his team who liked the song and played the track to him.

Background
Brooks commented on the album saying:

Track listing
The track ordering has varied on different releases of this album.

Original release

Limited series
"Standing Outside the Fire"
"The Night I Called the Old Man Out"
"American Honky-Tonk Bar Association"
"One Night a Day"
"Kickin' and Screamin'"
"Anonymous" (Tony Arata, Jon Schwabe) – 2:55
"Ain't Going Down ('Til the Sun Comes Up)"
"The Red Strokes"
"Callin' Baton Rouge"
"The Night Will Only Know"
"The Cowboy Song"

The Remastered series
"Standing Outside the Fire"
"The Night I Called the Old Man Out"
"American Honky-Tonk Bar Association"
"One Night a Day"
"Ain't Going Down ('Til the Sun Comes Up)"
"Anonymous"
"Kickin' and Screamin'"
"The Red Strokes"
"Callin' Baton Rouge"
"The Night Will Only Know"
"The Cowboy Song"

Personnel

Sam Bacco – percussion on "Standing Outside The Fire"
Bruce Bouton – pedal steel guitar on "The Night I Called The Old Man Out" and "American Honky-Tonk Bar Association"; resonator guitar on "The Cowboy Song"
Garth Brooks –  vocals, acoustic guitar
Sam Bush – mandolin on "Standing Outside The Fire", "Callin' Baton Rouge" and "The Cowboy Song"; fiddle and backing vocals on "Callin' Baton Rouge"
Mark Casstevens – acoustic guitar
Mike Chapman – bass guitar
Kathy Chiavola – backing vocals
John Cowan – backing vocals on "Callin' Baton Rouge"
Helen Darling – harmony and backing vocals
Jerry Douglas – resonator guitar on "The Red Strokes", "Callin' Baton Rouge" and "The Cowboy Song"
Bobby Emmons – Hammond organ on "One Night a Day"
Ty England – acoustic guitar, harmony and backing vocals on "Anonymous"
Béla Fleck – banjo on "Callin' Baton Rouge"
Pat Flynn – acoustic guitar on "Callin' Baton Rouge"
Rob Hajacos – fiddle on "Standing Outside The Fire", "The Night I Called The Old Man Out", "American Honky-Tonk Bar Association", "Ain't Going Down (Til The Sun Comes Up)" and "The Cowboy Song"
Jim Horn – saxophone on "One Night a Day"
Roy Huskey Jr. – double bass on "The Cowboy Song"
Chris Leuzinger – acoustic and electric guitars
Steve McClure – electric and pedal steel guitars on "Anonymous"
Terry McMillan – harmonica on "Ain't Goin' Down Til the Sun Comes Up"
Farrell Morris – percussion on "Standing Outside The Fire"
Mike Palmer – drums and percussion on "Anonymous"
Milton Sledge – drums; percussion on "Standing Outside The Fire" and "The Night I Called The Old Man Out"
Bobby Wood – keyboards
Trisha Yearwood – harmony and backing vocals

Charts
In Pieces debuted at #1 on the U.S. Billboard 200, becoming his third, and #1 on the Top Country Albums, becoming his fourth #1 Country album. In August 2020, In Pieces was certified Diamond by the RIAA.

Weekly charts

Singles

Year-end charts

Decade-end charts

Certifications and sales

References

1993 albums
Garth Brooks albums
Liberty Records albums
Albums produced by Allen Reynolds
Canadian Country Music Association Top Selling Album albums